The trophy is awarded for the Vanderbilt Knockout Teams national bridge championship held at the spring American Contract Bridge League (ACBL) North American Bridge Championship (NABC).

The Vanderbilt is a knock-out team event. The event typically lasts seven days with each day being a round consisting of two sessions of 32 boards. The event is open and seeded.

History

The history of the prestigious contest began in 1928 when the inventor of modern contract bridge, Harold Stirling Vanderbilt, put the trophy bearing his name into play. The winners list is a who's who of bridge – including Vanderbilt himself, a winner in 1932 and 1940.

Winners receive replicas of the trophy, a practice initiated by Vanderbilt from the first running, and perpetuated under the terms of his will by a $100,000 trust fund that the ACBL administers. ACBL Headquarters in Horn Lake, Mississippi, displays replicas donated by the families of Caroline Taylor, who won the Vanderbilt in 1928, and Helen Sobel Smith, a Vanderbilt winner in 1944 and 1945 as Helen Sobel.

The Vanderbilt was contested annually in New York, as a separate championship, until it became part of the ACBL spring North American Bridge Championships in 1958.

Winners

Four Vanderbilt Trophy champions have successfully defended the title without change in personnel (intact), on five occasions: 1938, 1945, 1956–57, and 1976. The triple winners from 1955 to 1957 were B. Jay Becker, John R. Crawford, George Rapée, Howard Schenken, Sidney Silodor, of whom Becker and Silodor were the 1944–45 winners with Charles Goren and Helen Sobel.

See also
Reisinger Board-a-Match Teams
Spingold Knockout Teams

References

Sources

 List of previous winners, Pages 6, 7. 

 2009 winners, Page 1. 
 NABC Winners. ACBL. Retrieved July 7, 2016.

North American Bridge Championships